or  is a lake in Alta Municipality in Troms og Finnmark county, Norway. It is located on the mainland, immediately north of the Langfjorden and about  straight east of the village of Øksfjordbotn (in Loppa Municipality). The lake has two small dams on the southeast end of the lake. The dams are part of a hydroelectric power plant, located just east of the lake.

See also
List of lakes in Norway

References

Alta, Norway
Reservoirs in Norway
Lakes of Troms og Finnmark